This page includes the discography of Greek contemporary laïka singer Peggy Zina. All of her albums have been released in Greece and Cyprus.

Discography

Studio albums
All the albums listed underneath were released and charted in Greece.

CD singles

Compilations

Discographies of Greek artists
Pop music discographies